Truro-Bible Hill-Millbrook-Salmon River is a provincial electoral district in  Nova Scotia, Canada, that elects one member to the Nova Scotia House of Assembly.

The electoral district was created in 1978 and was named Truro-Bible Hill until it was renamed in the 2012 electoral boundary review; there were no boundary changes.

The present name for the electoral district was used beginning with the 2013 provincial election.

Geography

Members of the Legislative Assembly
The electoral district has elected the following Members of the Legislative Assembly:

Election results

2021 general election

2020 by-election

2017 general election

2013 general election

|-
 
|New Democratic Party
|Lenore Zann
|align="right"|3,165 
|align="right"|38.05
|align="right"|-10.31
|-
 
|Liberal
|Barry J. Mellish 
|align="right"|2,682 
|align="right"|32.25
|align="right"|+12.72
 
|Progressive Conservative
|Charles Cox
|align="right"|2,470 
|align="right"|29.70 
|align="right"|-0.53
|-

|}

2009 general election

|-
 
|New Democratic Party
|Lenore Zann
|align="right"|4,070
|align="right"|48.37
|align="right"|+19.73
|-
 
|Progressive Conservative
|Hughie MacIsaac
|align="right"|2,544
|align="right"|30.23
|align="right"|-17.04
|-
 
|Liberal
|Bob Hagell
|align="right"|1,643
|align="right"|19.52
|align="right"|-1.80
|-

|}

2006 general election

|-
 
|Progressive Conservative
|Jamie Muir
|align="right"|3,711
|align="right"|47.27
|align="right"|+0.16
|-
 
|New Democratic Party
|Jim Harpell
|align="right"|2,248
|align="right"|28.64
|align="right"|+0.41
|-
 
|Liberal
|Ron Chisholm
|align="right"|1,674
|align="right"|21.32
|align="right"|-3.33
|-

|}

2003 general election

|-
 
|Progressive Conservative
|Jamie Muir
|align="right"|3,862
|align="right"|47.11
|align="right"|-6.47
|-
 
|New Democratic Party
|Jim Harpell
|align="right"|2,314
|align="right"|28.23
|align="right"|+0.02
|-
 
|Liberal
|Jeff Yuill
|align="right"|2,021
|align="right"|24.66
|align="right"|+6.45

|}

1999 general election

|-
 
|Progressive Conservative
|Jamie Muir
|align="right"|4,747
|align="right"|53.58
|align="right"|+11.55
|-
 
|New Democratic Party
|Ibel Scammell
|align="right"|2499
|align="right"|28.21
|align="right"|-1.82
|-
 
|Liberal
|Matthew Graham
|align="right"|1,613
|align="right"|18.21
|align="right"|-9.73

|}

1998 general election

1993 general election

1988 general election

1984 general election

1981 general election

1978 general election

References

External links
Riding profile

Nova Scotia provincial electoral districts
Truro, Nova Scotia